João Correia may refer to:
João Correia (cyclist) (born 1975), Portuguese cyclist
João Correia (rugby union) (born 1979), Portuguese rugby union player
João Correia (footballer, born 1911) (1911–1984), Portuguese footballer
João Correia (footballer, born 1996), Portuguese footballer for Vitória Guimarães B
João António Correia (1822–1896), Portuguese painter and art professor